The Ford D3 platform is an automobile platform assembled by Ford Motor Company.  In production between the 2005-2019 model years, the D3 platform is the fifteenth generation of full-size cars produced by Ford in North America. Marking the adoption of unibody chassis construction, a transverse engine configuration, front-wheel drive, all-wheel drive, and the lack of a V8 engine (for the first time since 1931), the D3 platform is derived from the 1998-2016 Volvo P2 architecture (designed prior to the 1999 acquisition of Volvo by Ford). Since 2008, the related D4 platform has served as a basis for crossover SUVs.

While the vehicles of the D3 platform were officially introduced as the replacement for the 1999-2007 D186 platform (Ford Taurus), in terms of market position and interior volume, they would effectively supersede the Ford and Mercury vehicles of the 1978-2012 Panther platform.

Between 2004 to 2019. All D3 vehicles have been assembled at Chicago Assembly in Chicago, Illinois along with the D4 Ford Explorer; the D4 Ford Flex and Lincoln MKT are assembled at Oakville Assembly in Oakville, Ontario, Canada.

Overview
The Ford D3 platform differs slightly from the original configuration of the Volvo P2 architecture.  To reduce production costs, Ford Motor Company adopted steel suspension arms (in place of aluminum) and similar material cost-saving measures.

In contrast to the Volvo P2 architecture, Ford adopted a common 112.9 wheelbase for each D3 variant (three inches longer than a Volvo S80, two inches shorter than a Ford Crown Victoria).  In place of the inline-5 and inline-6 engines used by Volvo, Ford adopted its own Duratec V6 engines.  As with the P2 platform, front-wheel drive is standard, with Haldex all-wheel drive (shared with the S80/XC90) fitted as an option.

As the first front-wheel drive full-size car platform produced by Ford, the D3 platform is also the first full-size Ford car produced with fully independent suspension, with a multi-link rear axle, coilover shocks and MacPherson front struts.  As with Ford Panther platform vehicles, the D3 is fitted with four-wheel disc brakes.

D4
The D4 platform is a revision of D3 unibody platform produced since 2008.  Developed to underpin crossover SUVs (including the Ford Flex, Lincoln MKT, and the MY 2011-2019 Ford Explorer), the variant is adaptable to multiple wheelbases; the suspension is also upgraded for off-road driving and towing.

Two variants of the D4 were developed as replacements for Panther-platform vehicles: the Ford Police Interceptor Utility (a police-use version of the Ford Explorer) served as a replacement for the Ford Crown Victoria Police Interceptor; Lincoln introduced limousine, and livery variants of the MKT, replacing similar conversions of the Lincoln Town Car.

Vehicles
Between the 2005 to 2019 model years, the Ford D3 platform has been utilized by Ford, Lincoln, and the (now-defunct) Mercury brands.  Introduced as the Ford Five Hundred and Mercury Montego, which were re-branded as the fifth-generation Ford Taurus and Mercury Sable for 2008.

For 2009, Lincoln offered its first version, the Lincoln MKS (effectively replacing the Lincoln Continental, then-discontinued in 2002); the sixth-generation Ford Taurus was introduced for 2010.

As part of the closure of the Mercury brand, the Mercury Sable ended production after the 2009 model year.  For 2017, Lincoln replaced the MKS with the revived Lincoln Continental, based on the CD4 architecture.

Concept cars
 2005 Mercury Meta One diesel-electric hybrid crossover SUV 
 2008 Lincoln MKT luxury crossover SUV not to be confused with the production car of the same name that is on a modified version of the  D3 platform known as D4.

References

 
D3